Fans of Boca Juniors are called Xeneizes.

Xeneizes is an album by the Icelandic hip hop group Quarashi, released on October 25, 1999, in Iceland.

Track listing
"Stick 'Em Up" (featuring Omar Swarez) – 3:49
"Tarfur" – 2:43
"Punk" (featuring Omar Swarez) – 2:59
"Jivin' About" – 3:50
"Brasilian Mongo" [Instrumental] – 3:22
"Model Citizen" – 3:50
"Tambourine Cut" – 2:44
"Xeneizes" – 3:08
"Mayday" (featuring Úlfur Kolka) – 3:35
"Surreal Rhyme" – 4:17
"Show Me What You Can" – 3:12
"Fuck You Puto" – 3:05
"Dive In" – 4:00
"Bless" [Instrumental] – 2:24

Bonus Media on CD

15. Fly To The Sky (Bonus Track)

16. Stay Funky [Instrumental] (Bonus Track)

17. Show Me What You Can [Instrumental] (Bonus Track)

18. Mayday [A Capella] (Bonus Track)

Personnel
Hössi Olafsson - Rapper, Singer on "Dive In"
Steini a.k.a. Stoney - Rapper, Singer on "Jivin' About"
Sölvi Blöndal - Producer, Drummer, Keyboardist, Percussionist
DJ Dice - DJ
Omar Swarez - Rapper
Úlfur Kolka - Rapper
Hrannar Ingimarsson - Producer, Engineer, Mixing, Keyboardist
Gaukur Úlfarsson - Bassist
Smári "Tarfur" Jósepsson - Guitarist
Vidar Hákon Gislason - Guitarist

Quarashi albums